Miloslav Mečíř defeated Michiel Schapers 6–2, 6–3, 6–4 to win the 1987 Heineken Open singles competition. Mark Woodforde was the defending champion.

Seeds
A champion seed is indicated in bold text while text in italics indicates the round in which that seed was eliminated.

  Miloslav Mečíř (champion)
  Milan Šrejber (second round)
  Ramesh Krishnan (quarterfinals)
  Marcel Freeman (quarterfinals)
  Derrick Rostagno (semifinals)
  Nduka Odizor (first round)
  Michiel Schapers (final)
  Bill Scanlon (first round)

Draw

Key
 Q – Qualifier
 WC – Wild card
 NB: The Final was the best of 5 sets while all other rounds were the best of 3 sets.

Final

Section 1

Section 2

External links
 Association of Tennis Professional (ATP) – 1987 Men's Singles draw

Singles
ATP Auckland Open